Altıkulaç can refer to:

 Altıkulaç, Abana, a village in Turkey
 Altıkulaç, Çan
 Altıkulaç Sarcophagus, a 4th-century sarcophagus